Citizens of Mauritania have various transportation methods. Railways and highways connect major cities in the country. Mauritania is a coastal country so there are many ports along its coast and there are a few big rivers that run through the country. Lastly, there are 26 airports spread out throughout the country.

Railways 

717 km total of single track  (standard gauge), owned and operated by a government mining company, Société Nationale Industrielle et Minière (National Mining and Industrial Company, SNIM). The railway goes from the mines at Zouerat and El Rhein, passes another mine at Fderik, and ends at the port of Nouadhibou/Cansado.
One of the world's longest trains (up to 2.5 km long) runs here, with more than 200 wagons mainly transporting iron ore, and some carriages for passengers; alternatively, people sit on top of the iron piles.

There are no rail links with adjacent countries.

In 2008, a railway was proposed that would link Nouakchott with Tiguint, Mederdra, R'Kiz, Leguatt, Leeleibatt, Menjem Boffal, Kaedi, and Bofal.

Maps

Timeline

2007 
 Sunday, August 5, 2007 - Sudan, China To Build $630 Mln Mauritania Railway. 
Sudan's Danfodio Holding and China's Transtech Engineering have signed an agreement to build a 460 million euro ($634 million) railway linking Mauritania's capital Nouakchott with southern phosphate deposits at Bofal.  The  line would run close to the southern frontier with Senegal.  It is hoped that the new line would link with existing lines just across the border in Senegal, Mali There is no through link to Burkina Faso.  There are problems of choice of gauge.

2008 
 May - 8 new EMD locomotives

2013 
 Proposed line for phosphate traffic - 430 km long railway line, Nouakchott and Kaedi, Mauritania's third city, through Tiguint, Mederdra, R'Kiz, Leguatt, Leeleibatt and Menjem Boffal, is to be constructed in three years time.

2014 
 Glencore Xstrata proposes branch lines to new mines at Askaf and Guelb El Aouj sharing infrastructure of SNIM.

Motorway 
There are 450 km of Motorway in Mauritania (in 2010), connecting Nouakchott to Nouadhibou along a coastal route. A motorway linking Nouakchott to Rosso is under construction (due for completion in 2012).

Highways 

The country's size and harsh climate make road maintenance and repair especially problematic. Overland travel is difficult and roadside assistance is almost nonexistent. Public transportation is not safe and road conditions in Mauritania are poor, particularly in the interior. Driving in Mauritania can be treacherous, and many Mauritanians drive without regard to traffic signs or rules. Roadway obstructions and hazards caused by drifting sand, animals, and poor roads often plague motorists.

International highways

The Cairo-Dakar Highway in the Trans-African Highway network passes through Mauritania, linking Nouakchott to Rabat, Tangiers, Algiers, and Tripoli.  The section between the capital Nouakchott and the port of Nouadhibou was paved by 2018; only a few kilometres remain unpaved at the Moroccan border :fr:Transport en Mauritanie. From Dakar there are links throughout western Africa.

The north-western end of the Trans–West African Coastal Highway is considered by the Economic Community of West African States (ECOWAS) to originate in Nouakchott.

Waterways 
Mostly ferry traffic on the Senegal River

Ports and harbours

Atlantic Ocean 
(from north to south)
Nouadhibou
Nouakchott

Senegal River 
Rosso
Kaedi
Bogue

Merchant marine 
None as of 2002

Airports (paved) 
See Airports in Mauritania

9 in total (2002)
3 are of length 2,438 to 3,047 m
6 are of length 1,524 to 2,437 m

By city: 
 Aioun el Atrouss
 Akjoujt
 Atar International
 Bir Moghrein 
 Abbaye 
 Boutilimit
 Dahara Airport
 Fderik
 Kaédi 
 Kiffa
 Letfotar
 Néma 
 Nouadhibou International
 Nouakchott (former airport)
 Nouakchott–Oumtounsy International
 Sélibaby
 Tamchakett
 Tichitt
 Tidjikja 
 Timbedra
 Tazadit

Airports (unpaved) 
See Airports in Mauritania

17 in total (2002)
2 are of length 2,438 to 3,047 m
5 are of length 1,524 to 2,437 m
7 are of length 914 to 1,523 m
3 are of length under 914 m

See also 
Mauritania
Longest trains
National railway passing through foreign territory
Mauritania Airlines

References